Chelidonura electra is a species of sea slug, a "headshield slug", a marine opisthobranch gastropod mollusk in the family Aglajidae. The species name comes from the daughter of Agamemnon, Electra, and the Greek goddess of the same name, meaning "shining", with reference to the brilliance of this slug.

Description
Chelidonura electra can reach a length of about 6–11 cm. The body is white with bright yellow margins and a large fleshy tail.

Distribution
This headshield slug lives in the tropical Indo-West Pacific, from Madagascar to Indonesia and East Australia.

Habitat
This species can be found on shallow sand flats, associated with Porites species of coral.

References
 Chelidonura electra. Sea Slug Forum
  WoRMS
 EoL

External links
 

Aglajidae
Gastropods described in 1970